Nationwide League may refer to:
Nigeria Nationwide League, the third level of club football in Nigeria
Nationwide Football League, English Football League
Nationwide League (Kenya), replaced by FKF Division One
Nationwide League (Kenya Rugby Union), a domestic Kenyan rugby union competition